Salton is a village and civil parish in the Ryedale district of North Yorkshire, England. The population of the village at the 2011 census was 110, but the details can be found listed in the civil parish of Edstone.

History
Salton is mentioned in the Domesday Book as belonging to the then Archbishop of York and having four villagers and five ploughlands. The name of the village derives from the Old English words of Salh, meaning a willow or sallow and tūn, which means an enclosure or farmstead.

During the 12th century, the Norman Church of St John of Beverley, was set alight with the villagers inside by marauding Scots. The church, which had its last major renovation in 1881, was restored again in 2019 with a grant from the Heritage Lottery Funding. The church has been described as being a "near perfect example of Norman architecture", and is now a grade I listed building.

The population of the village in 2011 was 110, but for the purposes of census information, the data was included in the parish of Edstone. North Yorkshire County Council estimated the population of the parish to be 100 people in 2015.

Geography
Salton is in the relatively low-lying fertile land of the Vale of Pickering near to the confluence of the rivers Dove and Rye.

References

External links

Villages in North Yorkshire
Civil parishes in North Yorkshire